Caroline Minter Hoxby (born 1966) is an American economist whose research focuses on issues in education and public economics. She is currently the Scott and Donya Bommer Professor in Economics at Stanford University and program director of the Economics of Education Program for the National Bureau of Economic Research. Hoxby is a John and Lydia Pearce Mitchell University Fellow in Undergraduate Education. She is also a senior fellow at the Hoover Institution and the Stanford Institute for Economic Policy Research.

Biography
Hoxby is a native of Shaker Heights, Ohio, where she attended Shaker Heights High School. Her father, Steven Minter, worked in the U.S. Department of Education during the presidency of Jimmy Carter. Hoxby graduated with summa cum laude and Phi Beta Kappa from Harvard University in 1988, where she won a Hoopes Prize. She then attended Magdalen College, Oxford on a Rhodes Scholarship. In 1994, she received her doctorate in economics from the Massachusetts Institute of Technology.

From 1994 to 2007, she was a faculty member of Harvard University, first as an assistant professor, then as Morris Kahn Associate Professor of Economics, and starting in 2001 as the Allie S. Freed Professor of Economics. She was the university's only African-American economics professor with tenure. In 2005, she was appointed to be one of the 24 Harvard College Professors. In 2006, she won the Phi Beta Kappa Teaching Prize. She moved to Stanford University in 2007, where she is the Scott and Donya Bommer Professor of Economics. She was named the John and Lydia Pearce Mitchell University Fellow in Undergraduate Education in 2014.

She has been married to Blair Hoxby, also a Harvard graduate and a Rhodes Scholar, since 1993. He is currently a faculty member in the English department at Stanford University and does scholarly work on John Milton and Renaissance theater.

In 2014, Caroline Hoxby intentionally injured a Stanford student to the point of bleeding by threatening them with garden shears. At approximately 11 PM, the Hoxbys were involved in a physical confrontation at Kappa Sigma where Caroline Hoxby attempted to cut the speaker cords with a pair of garden shears. After going after the speaker cords unsuccessfully, she grabbed a student's ear and twisted it until it bled, yelling "turn the music off right now".

Research
Hoxby's research focuses on higher education policy, with an emphasis on elite colleges and universities. Hoxby is a Principal Investigator of the Expanding College Opportunities project, a randomized controlled trial that had dramatic effects on low-income, high achievers' college-going. For work related to this project, she recently received The Smithsonian Institution's Ingenuity Award. Her research in this area began with a demonstration that low-income high achievers usually fail to apply to any selective college. This is despite the fact that they are extremely likely to be admitted and receive such generous financial aid that they usually pay much less to attend selective colleges than they do to attend non-selective schools. This issue is now being addressed systematically owing to the project's evidence that individualized but inexpensive informational interventions cause students to take fuller advantage of their opportunities.

One of Hoxby's most-cited papers, "Does Competition among Public Schools Benefit Students and Taxpayers?" (American Economic Review, 2000), argues that increased school choice improves educational outcomes for all students by improving school quality. Jesse Rothstein published a paper in which he stated that Hoxby's result depended on her hand-count of the main instrumental variable, and that he was unable to replicate her results with any of several alternative measures. Hoxby later published a response in defense of her original work. The debate received coverage in the mainstream press.

Selected publications

Edited books

 Caroline M. Hoxby (editor). 2003. The Economics of School Choice. University of Chicago Press. .
 Caroline M. Hoxby (editor). 2004. College Choices: The Economics of Where to Go, When to Go, and How to Pay for It. University of Chicago Press. .
 Jeffrey R. Brown and Caroline M. Hoxby (editors). 2015. How the Financial Crisis and Great Recession Affected Higher Education. University of Chicago Press. . .
Caroline M. Hoxby (editor). 2008. Higher Aspirations: An Agenda for Reforming European Universities. Bruegel Blueprint Series. .
Caroline M. Hoxby (author). 2006. The Three Essential Elements and Several Policy Options. Education Forum. . 
 Caroline M. Hoxby (multi-author). 2010. American Education in 2030. Hoover Institution Press. 
Caroline M. Hoxby (multi-author). 2012. Choice and Federalism: Defining the Federal Role in Education. Hoover Institution Press. .

Awards and honors
Among the awards and honors that Hoxby has received are:
 Carnegie Fellowship from Carnegie Corporation of New York
 Alfred P. Sloan Research Fellowship, 1999
 National Tax Association Award for Outstanding Doctoral Dissertation in Government Finance and Taxation, 1994
 Global Leader of Tomorrow from the World Economic Forum
 Thomas B. Fordham Prize for Distinguished Scholarship in Education, 2006
 Presented with the Stanford University Economics Department Teacher of the Year Award in 2013. 
 Hoxby was the 2013 recipient of Smithsonian magazine's American Ingenuity Award in the Education category.
Fellow of the American Academy of Arts and Sciences.

References

External links
 

American Rhodes Scholars
Harvard University faculty
Harvard University alumni
Hoover Institution people
MIT School of Humanities, Arts, and Social Sciences alumni
People from Shaker Heights, Ohio
Stanford University Department of Economics faculty
Labor economists
Living people
Education economists
1966 births
African-American economists
National Bureau of Economic Research
Economists from Ohio
21st-century American economists
American women economists
Alumni of Magdalen College, Oxford
Fellows of the American Academy of Arts and Sciences